The 2017–18 New Mexico State Aggies men's basketball team represented New Mexico State University during the 2017–18 NCAA Division I men's basketball season. The Aggies, led by first-year head coach Chris Jans, played their home games at the Pan American Center in Las Cruces, New Mexico as members of the Western Athletic Conference. They finished the season 28–6, 12–2 in WAC play to win the WAC regular season championship. In the WAC tournament, they defeated Chicago State, Seattle, and Grand Canyon to become WAC Tournament champions. They received the WAC's automatic bid to the NCAA tournament where they lost in the first round to Clemson.

Previous season 
The Aggies finished the 2016–17 season 28–6, 11–3 in WAC play to finish in a tie for second place. They defeated Chicago State, UMKC, and Cal State Bakersfield to win the WAC tournament. As a result, they received the conference's automatic bid to the NCAA tournament where they lost in the first round to Baylor.

On April 11, 2017, head coach Paul Weir resigned to become the head coach at New Mexico. On April 17, the school hired Chris Jans as head coach.

Offseason

Departures

Incoming transfers

2017 recruiting class

Roster

Schedule and results

|-
!colspan=9 style=| Exhibition

|-
!colspan=9 style=| Regular season

|-
!colspan=9 style=| WAC tournament

|-
!colspan=12 style=| NCAA tournament

References

New Mexico State Aggies men's basketball seasons
New Mexico State
New Mexico State
Aggies
Aggies